Zoran Milović (born 13 July 1977) is a Serbian professional basketball coach and former player.

References

External links
 Eurobasket profile
 RealGM profile
 BIBL profile
 FIBA Profile
 Proballers Profile

1977 births
Living people
Apollon Patras B.C. players
AEL Limassol B.C. players
Basketball League of Serbia players
Keravnos B.C. players
KK Borovica players
KK MZT Skopje players
KK Jagodina players
KK Lions/Swisslion Vršac players
KK Lovćen players
KK Sloga players
KK Zdravlje players
OKK Vrbas players
Serbian expatriate basketball people in Canada
Serbian expatriate basketball people in Cyprus
Serbian expatriate basketball people in Greece
Serbian expatriate basketball people in Montenegro
Serbian expatriate basketball people in Romania
Serbian expatriate basketball people in North Macedonia
Serbian men's basketball players
Serbian men's basketball coaches
People from Vrbas, Serbia
Power forwards (basketball)